Urun may refer to:
Ürün, a Turkish magazine
Urun, Iran, a village in Isfahan Province, Iran